Street Life is a studio album by the American jazz band The Crusaders. It was a top 20 album on three Billboard charts and represents the peak of the band's commercial popularity. The title track, featuring singer Randy Crawford, was a Top 40 pop single (No. 36) and became the group's most successful entry on the soul chart (No. 17). It was No. 5 on the UK Singles Chart. "Street Life" also hit the disco chart, peaking at No. 75, and was re-recorded by Doc Severinsen with Crawford reprising her vocal for the opening sequence of the noir crime drama Sharky's Machine, directed by Burt Reynolds in 1981. This faster paced  version was also featured in Quentin Tarantino's Jackie Brown, released in 1997.

The cover photograph was taken at 409 N Rodeo Drive, Beverly Hills, California.

Accolades
The album was included in the book 1001 Albums You Must Hear Before You Die.

Track listing
"Street Life" (Will Jennings, Joe Sample) – 11:18
"My Lady" (Wilton Felder) – 6:43
"Rodeo Drive (High Steppin')" (Sample) – 4:28
"Carnival of the Night" (Felder) – 6:24
"The Hustler" (Stix Hooper) – 5:18
"Night Faces" 	(Sample) – 5:10

Personnel
Arthur Adams - guitar
Roland Bautista - guitar
David T. Walker - guitar
Oscar Brashear - trumpet
Garnett Brown - trombone
Randy Crawford - vocals
Paulinho Da Costa - percussion
Wilton Felder - saxophone, bass guitar, producer
Barry Finnerty - guitar
William Green - saxophone
Stix Hooper - drums, producer
Paul Jackson Jr. - guitar
James Jamerson Jr. - bass guitar
Alphonso Johnson - bass guitar
Robert O. Bryant Sr. - trumpet
Robert Bryant Jr. - saxophone
Jerome Richardson - saxophone
Billy Rogers - guitar
Joe Sample - keyboards, producer

Charts
Album - Billboard (United States)

Singles - Billboard (United States)

References

External links
Transcription of Joe Sample's piano solo on Track 1 - "Street Life"

The Crusaders albums
1979 albums
MCA Records albums
Albums recorded at A&M Studios